Malovice is a municipality and village in Prachatice District in the South Bohemian Region of the Czech Republic. It has about 600 inhabitants.

Administrative parts
Villages of Holečkov, Hradiště, Krtely, Malovičky and Podeřiště are administrative parts of Malovice.

Transport

There are two train stops in the municipality, Malovice u Netolic and Holečkov.

References

Villages in Prachatice District